The West Sussex Football League is a football competition in England. It was formed in 1896. The League has eight divisions of which the highest, the Premier Division, sits at level 12 of the English football league system. It is a feeder to the Southern Combination League Division Two. Membership is not limited to clubs from West Sussex. Currently the league also includes teams from Surrey and Hampshire though these are from places that are close to the county boundaries.

Cup Competitions 
The West Sussex Football League operates one pre-season opener, three league cups and five charity cup competitions.

Walter Rossiter Memorial Trophy
The pre-season opening match of the season is the Walter Rossiter Trophy which is contested between the previous season's league winner and Centenary Cup winners. The current holder is West Chiltington.

League Cups 
The league's main cup is the Centenary Cup which includes teams from the league's top three tiers, from the Premier Division to Division Two. The current holder of the cup is Capel.

The league's two other cups are the Tony Kopp Cup for the Northern section of Divisions 3, 4 and 5 and the Bareham Trophy for the Southern sections of the same lower divisions. The current holder of the Tony Kopp Cup is Barns Green Reserves and the holder of the Bareham Trophy is Barnham Trojans Reserves.

Charity Cups
The remaining competitions within the league are the charity cups, these operate laterally across the northern and southern section of each division. These cups are:

2022–23 members

Premier Division
Barns Green | Fishbourne | Harting | Lavant | Newtown Villa | Petworth | Rudgwick | Sompting | Stedham United | The Unicorn Bognor Regis | Upper Beeding Reserves

Championship
Barnham Trojans | Billingshurst Reserves | Boys Club Old Boys | Cowfold | Ewhurst | Felpham Colts | Henfield | Horsham Crusaders | Hunston Community Club | Watersfield | Wisborough Green

Division One
AFC Southbourne | Delunited | East Dean | Horsham Trinity | Northbrook | Pulborough | Rudgwick Reserves | Slinfold | Southwater Royals | TD Shipley | The Unicorn Bognor Regis Reserves | Yapton

Division Two North
Barns Green Reserves | Billingshurst 3rds | Capel Reserves | Holbrook Olympic | Horsham Baptists & Ambassadors | Horsham Crusaders | Newdigate | Slinfold Reserves | Southwater Reserves | TD Shipley Reserves | Watersfield Reserves | Westcott (1935)

Division Two South
Angmering | Angmering Village | Barnham Trojans Reserves | Beaumont Park | Bosham Reserves | Chapel | Fittleworth | Flansham Park Rangers | Milland | Optimus | Wittering United

Division Three North
Brockham | Crawley Rangers | Ewhurst Reserves | Holbrook Olympic Reserves | Horsham Baptists & Ambassadors Reserves | Horsham Crusaders Reserves | Horsham Trinity Reserves | Pulborough Reserves | Rudgwick Development | Southwater Royals Reserves | Southwater 3rds | TD Shipley 3rds

Division Three South
AFC Fernhurst | AFC Littlehampton | Ambassadors | Felpham Colts Reserves | Ferring Reserves | Flansham Park Rangers Reserves | Goring by Sea Cricket | Hunston Community Club Reserves | Worthing Town Reserves | Yapton Reserves

Division Three Central
Ashington Rovers | Ashurst United | Cowfold Reserves | Fittleworth Reserves | Henfield Reserves | Horsham Crusaders Development | Lodsworth | Partridge Green | Petworth Reserves | Plaistow | Stedham United Reserves

Past divisional champions
The league ran 11 divisions up until 2015 when Division 5 Central was dropped. In 2016, Division One was split into North and South to increase back to 11 divisions.

External links
 Official site

 
Football in West Sussex
Football leagues in England
Sports leagues established in 1896
1896 establishments in England